Michael John McCord (born January 23, 1959) is an American government official and Under Secretary of Defense (Comptroller) in the Biden administration. McCord previously served in the same role from June 27, 2014 to January 20, 2017.

Education 
McCord was born and raised in Marion, Ohio, graduating from River Valley High School in 1977. He earned a Bachelor of Arts degree in economics from the Ohio State University in 1981 and a Master of Arts in public policy analysis from the University of Pennsylvania in 1984.

Career 
During his career, McCord worked in the staff of the Senate Committee on Armed Services, House Committee on the Budget, and Congressional Budget Office. During the Obama administration, McCord served in the United States Department of Defense as deputy comptroller, CFO, and Under Secretary of Defense (Comptroller). After leaving office, he became the director of civic-military programs at the Stennis Center for Public Service.

President Biden nominated McCord to serve again as Comptroller, and his nomination was confirmed by voice vote on May 28, 2021.

References 

1959 births
Living people
People from Marion, Ohio
Ohio State University alumni
University of Pennsylvania alumni
Obama administration personnel
Biden administration personnel
United States Department of Defense officials